Doctor Phosphorus (Alexander James Sartorius) is a fictional supervillain who has appeared in various comic book series published by DC Comics. Primarily an enemy of Batman, the villain exists in DC's main shared universe, known as the DC Universe.

Publication history
Doctor Phosphorus first appeared in Detective Comics #469 and was created by Steve Englehart.

Fictional character biography
Dr. Alex Sartorius, alias Doctor Phosphorus was a member of the Tobacconists' Club, who wanted to build a nuclear power plant in Gotham City with help from the Club's chairman, Rupert Thorne. However, the people of Gotham refused the construction of the plant and he was forced to take the project far from the city. Eventually, Sartorius was transformed by sand irradiated during the nuclear plant's meltdown, driven up one element on the chemical table, from silicon to phosphorus. His body was changed as his skin would burn at any contact and his skeleton showed through his flesh similar to x-ray. For his mutation, he swore to make Gotham pay by poisoning the water supply. This plan was foiled by the timely intervention of Gotham's protector, Batman, but Phosphorus escaped from the vigilante and contacted Thorne to eliminate Batman.  Batman however continued his search for Phosphorus and they eventually clashed in the nuclear power plant where everything started. During the struggle, Dr. Phosphorus fell into the nuclear reactor, creating a big explosion and he was presumed dead. 

During the Underworld Unleashed storyline, he is one of many villains to sell his soul to the demon Neron. In exchange for it, he is granted better control of his powers. For example, he can now wear normal clothing without it bursting into flame.

In James Robinson's series Starman he is initially hired by the Mist to kill the original Starman, Ted Knight, but is defeated by the retired hero. They face each other a second time; this time, Phosphorus has given Knight a significant dose of radiation, which gave him terminal disease. In a third and final confrontation, Knight is determined to ensure that Phosphorus would harm no one else. During the battle, he uses his cosmic rod to tear the pavement from beneath Phosphorus and drive him into the earth, apparently killing him.

Phosphorus returns in Detective Comics #825, where he is being held in Cadmus Research laboratories. When one of the scientists examining him says he heard Sartorius had died, the other replies: "From being crushed? Hardly. Everything human in Sartorius was consumed by fire long ago. We believe his powers manifested a fusion reaction that completely sublimated his central nervous system — creating functional facsimiles of his heart, his lungs, his kidneys — all working in concert to produce a near-endless supply of energy".

Phosphorus escapes from Cadmus, and once again seeks revenge on those responsible for his condition. He is defeated by Batman during an attack on Rupert Thorne, and he is imprisoned in Arkham Asylum.

During Batman's absence after his presumed death, Phosphorus escapes custody along with the other Arkham inmates. He kidnaps both Kirk Langstrom and his wife Francine for information about Langstrom's research. Phosphorus caused Kirk to transform into Man-Bat and throw Phosphorus into the ocean.

During the Brightest Day crossover event, Phosphorus is freed from Arkham when Deathstroke and the Titans attack the facility. Before Phosphorus can escape, he is attacked by Arsenal.

In 2011, The New 52 rebooted the DC Comics universe. Doctor Phosphorus is reintroduced fighting Catwoman in the Forever Evil storyline, appearing among the villains that the Crime Syndicate of America recruits to join the Secret Society of Super Villains.

He has since being seen in the background during the Rebirth Batman titles such as Batman: Eternal and being one of the Arkham Knight's soldiers.

In the pages of Batman: Three Jokers, Doctor Phosphorus is shown to be incarcerated at Blackgate Penitentiary at the time when Batman arrives to see Joe Chill.

Powers and abilities
Doctor Phosphorus has the ability to manipulate radiation for various effects, such as burning skin and toxic fume emissions. His body's major organs are not present, but he produces an endlessly source of energy for himself. When he sold his soul to Neron, Sartorius was granted greater powers, as well as temperature control.

Other versions

Flashpoint
In the alternate timeline of the Flashpoint event, Doctor Phosphorus was invited by Lt. Matthew Shrieve to be the new member of Creature Commandos, but Doctor Phosphorus then betrays him and kills his family. It is revealed that Doctor Phosphorus had been working for General Sam Lane who is responsible for the deaths of Miranda's family.

In other media

Television
 Doctor Phosphorus' appearance was used as inspiration for the character Derek Powers / Blight in Batman Beyond, voiced by Sherman Howard. As the result of an accident, his body emits high levels of radiation that render his body translucent.
 Doctor Phosphorus was used as inspiration for Garfield Lynns / Firefly in The Batman episode "White Heat", voiced by Jason Marsden. After several defeats at Batman's hand, Firefly and his girlfriend, Dr. Jane Blazedale, attempt to steal a phosphorus isotope so he can upgrade his arsenal. However, an accident occurs and Firefly is transformed into Phosphorus, leaving him with a magma-like physiology and a burning touch. As he slowly goes insane, he attempts to destroy Gotham in retaliation for no one being able to remember his name, only to be defeated by Batman once more.
 Doctor Phosphorus will appear in the upcoming HBO Max / DC Universe (DCU) animated miniseries Creature Commandos as a member of the titular team.

Film
Doctor Phosphorus appears in The Lego Batman Movie.

Video games
Dr. Alex Sartorius appears in Batman: Arkham Knight via Simon Stagg's audiotapes. This version was raised as a Catholic, but chose science over faith, and went on to work for Stagg at Stagg Industries. After Sartorius discovered Stagg was collaborating with the Scarecrow with Stagg Industries' Cloudburst technology, Stagg exposes Sartorius to Scarecrow's fear toxin, causing the former to develop extreme pyrophobia.

Miscellaneous
Doctor Phosphorus appears in Smallville Season 11: Titans. After Rose Wilson breaks him out of prison, he attacks an amusement park until Superman, Jay Garrick, and the Teen Titans arrive and defeat him. Phosphorus is later taken into the Department of Extranormal Operations' custody.

Further reading
 Dr. Phosphorus: Walter Simonson recalls the real origin of the brilliant bad guy in Comic Book Artist Collection: Volume 2 by Jon Cooke, TwoMorrows Publishing (2002) page 20-22

See also
 List of Batman family enemies

References

External links
Doctor Phosphorus at Comic Vine

Fictional characters who have made pacts with devils
Fictional characters with energy-manipulation abilities
Fictional characters with fire or heat abilities
Fictional characters with nuclear or radiation abilities
DC Comics scientists
DC Comics supervillains
DC Comics metahumans
Comics characters introduced in 1977
Characters created by Steve Englehart
Batman characters
de:Schurken im Batman-Universum#Doctor Phosphorus